Rozdil is an urban-type settlement in Stryi Raion of Lviv Oblast in Ukraine. It is located close to the right bank of the Dniester. Rozdil belongs to Novyi Rozdil urban hromada, one of the hromadas of Ukraine. Population: 

Until 18 July 2020, Rozdil belonged to Mykolaiv Raion. The raion was abolished in July 2020 as part of the administrative reform of Ukraine, which reduced the number of raions of Lviv Oblast to seven. The area of Mykolaiv Raion was merged into Stryi Raion.

Economy

Transportation
Rozdil is connected by roads with Mykolaiv, where there is access to Highway M06 connecting Lviv with Uzhhorod. It also has access to Highway M12 connecting Stryi and Ternopil.

References

Urban-type settlements in Stryi Raion